Anna Clunes  is a British diplomat, who has served as the British Ambassador to Poland since September 2020.

Clunes was appointed a Companion of the Order of Saint Michael and Saint George in October 2020 for "services to British foreign policy".

References 

Living people
Ambassadors of the United Kingdom to Poland
British diplomats
Alumni of the University of Cambridge
Year of birth missing (living people)